Snehasis Chakraborty is an Indian politician who currently serves as Cabinet Minister for Transport of the Government of West Bengal.  He is an MLA, elected from the Jangipara constituency in the 2011 West Bengal state assembly election.  In 2016 and 2021 assembly election he was re-elected from the same constituency.

References 

Trinamool Congress politicians from West Bengal
Living people
People from Hooghly district
West Bengal MLAs 2021–2026
1970 births